Meria Aires (or popularly known as Maria or Meria Aires; born February 16, 1989) is a Bruneian singer-songwriter.

Biography
She began her career in 2005 in a radio singing contest organized by Kristal FM in conjunction with His Majesty the Sultan of Brunei Darussalam's birthday celebrations. Despite only winning Silver, Angan (an original song composed by her own uncle, Nan), was very well received by radio listeners at that time. Her music genre was new to the local during the time and her songs revolutionized the music industry in Brunei. Her ability to play musical instrument such as guitar made her a unique pop singer and interests several songwriters during the time of her early career. It is also notable that her voice and singing skill are one of her unique ability.

The success of, Angan, had encouraged her to try her luck in releasing her first official single, Bisik Hati, in 2006 – a song that had changed her life instantly. She began performing at various state and corporate functions, winning more music awards locally than any other Bruneian celebrities in Brunei's music history and finally releasing her second album (first solo album), Sesaat Kau Hadir, on May 23, 2009. She won the Pelangi Awards on the undisputed four straight years. For the first year of her four-year streak, thanks to her first hit single, Bisik Hati, she won the top female singer category in the award. In 2007, Maria and a male band named The Seeds collaborate and developed a song called Kau Tetap Milikku. This song took a great leap to her career as 'Kau Tetap Milikku' helped her win the 'Song of Choice' category in the Pelangi Award. In 2008, she won the 'Chosen Female Artist' category beating several new top singers. During her fourth year voted for the award, she won the new Pelangi Award's B Mobile's Most Voted Singer category which in the same time became the first singer to win the award.

Quoted in an interview with local media, she recalls a music collaboration with Merah band from Singapore as one of her most memorable moments in her career. Biar Sampai Akhir was launched on the February 13, 2011, at Kallang CC Singapore along with its official music video produced by Singaporean production company Merah in Motion. Despite being a university student in University of Brunei Darussalam, she managed to attend several local live shows in the country.

Aires represented Radio Televisyen Brunei (RTB) Brunei at the first ABU Radio Song Festival, which took place at the KBS Concert Hall in Seoul, South Korea on October 11, 2012, a competition that brought Brunei the Silver award.

Discography
Studio Album

Singles

Awards and achievements

Awards

Other Achievements

References

1989 births
Living people
Bruneian women singers
21st-century women singers